Sagola is a genus of beetles in the Staphylinidae family. It was first described by the entomologist David Sharp in 1874. The New Zealand species within the genus were revised in 2014 with numerous new species being described.

Species
Species include:
 Sagola hirtalis Broun, 1893
 Sagola terricola Broun, 1886
 Sagola convexa Broun, 1886
 Sagola coromandelensis Park and Carlton, 2014
 Sagola northlandensis Park and Carlton, 2014
 Sagola taranakiensis Park and Carlton, 2014
 Sagola kuscheli Park and Carlton, 2014
 Sagola newtoni Park and Carlton, 2014
 Sagola thorpei Park and Carlton, 2014
 Sagola dugdalei Park and Carlton, 2014
 Sagola thayerae Park and Carlton, 2014
 Sagola hunuaensis Park and Carlton, 2014
 Sagola waikatoensis Park and Carlton, 2014
 Sagola gisbornensis Park and Carlton, 2014
 Sagola weiri Park and Carlton, 2014
 Sagola brookesi Park and Carlton, 2014
 Sagola rugifrons Broun, 1895
 Sagola waipouaensis Park and Carlton, 2014
 Sagola brouni Park and Carlton, 2014
 Sagola plentyensis Park and Carlton, 2014
 Sagola bifida Broun, 1915
 Sagola latistriata Broun, 1911

References 

Pselaphinae genera